is the third single by the Japanese idol girl group Onyanko Club. It was released in Japan on February 21, 1986.

Outline 
Sonoko Kawai would graduate with her, however, this song focuses on Nakajima's graduation, as Kawai did not decide to graduate until shortly after Nakajima, and she would continue to work as a solo artist after this, but Nakajima will retire from the entertainment industry on this occasion. Therefore, on the record jacket, Nakajima is emphasized and Kawai is not in the photo. According to an official, Kawai herself was agreeable to this treatment.

Track listing

Charts

Weekly charts

Year-end charts

Cover versions 
 The Nolans covered the song in English as "Johnny" in their 1991 album Tidal Wave (Samishii Nettaigyo).

References 

Onyanko Club songs
1986 songs
1986 singles
Songs with lyrics by Yasushi Akimoto
Pony Canyon singles
Oricon Weekly number-one singles